MGAC may refer to:

Muthurangam Govt. Arts College, college in Tamil Nadu, India
Mirndiyan Gununa Aboriginal Corporation, an organisation in Queensland, Australia